Michel Biron,  (born March 16, 1934) is a Canadian former Senator. Biron was appointed on the advice of Prime Minister Jean Chrétien, to represent the Canadian senatorial division of Mille Isles, Quebec as a member of the Liberal Party of Canada, on October 4, 2001. Biron was appointed a Member of the Order of Canada in 2001. 

On 10 June 2005, Senator Michel Biron declared that the conditions placed on Karla Homolka's release were "totalitarian", according to an interview with CTV Newsnet. Two weeks later, Biron apologized.

Biron left the Senate on March 16, 2009, upon reaching the mandatory retirement age of 75. He presently lives in Nicolet, Quebec.

External links
 Parliament of Canada - Profile of Senator Michel Biron
 

1934 births
Living people
Liberal Party of Canada senators
Members of the Order of Canada
Canadian senators from Quebec
21st-century Canadian politicians